Paul D. Moriarty (born September 25, 1956) is an American Democratic Party politician who represents the 4th Legislative District in the New Jersey General Assembly since taking office on January 10, 2006. He served as the Assembly's Deputy Speaker since 2018.

Early life 
Moriarty worked as an investigative journalist at KYW-TV for 17 years protecting consumer rights and investigating unscrupulous or unethical businesses. Before KYW, Moriarty was a news producer at WCAU-TV. Moriarty's has earned over 30 Emmy Awards, honors from the National Press Association, the Associated Press and the Radio-Television News Directors Association. He was a member of American Federation of Television and Radio Artists (AFTRA) for 20 years while working as a journalist. He served six years as a shop steward.

Mayor of Washington Township 
Running on a platform of open government, property tax relief, and the elimination of waste and inefficiency, Moriarty was elected Mayor of Washington Township in November 2004. He garnered 60% of the vote in a hotly contested four-way race in which Republican voters were sharply divided. He was mayor of Washington Township for one term from 2005 until 2008. After forming a recall committee, on June 9, 2006, a Washington Township resident filed a petition to recall Moriarty from his post as mayor, with the goal of placing the initiative on the November 2006 general election ballot based on obtaining the requisite number of about 8,000 signatures needed for recall. The recall effort was ultimately unsuccessful.

New Jersey Assembly 
Moriarty was elected to the Assembly on November 8, 2005, filling the seat of fellow Democrat Robert J. Smith II, who did not run for re-election and had held the seat in the Assembly since 2000.
On June 1, 2006, Assemblyman Moriarty, along with State Senator Stephen M. Sweeney (D, 3rd legislative district) and fellow Assembly Democrat Jerry Green (D, 22nd legislative district), held a press conference to announce their support for significant cuts to New Jersey state worker salaries and benefits of up to 15%.  This effort was proposed to avoid a one-point increase in the state's sales tax designed to cover a multibillion-dollar gap in the state's budget. Significant negative reaction from the state's labor unions resulted primarily because of Sweeney's position as an Ironworkers business agent and treasurer from Gloucester County for Ironworker's Local 399, and also due to his position as the chairman of the Senate Labor committee which controls most labor-related bills, but also because of Moriarty's history as an AFTRA shop steward and stated support of the collective bargaining process.

Committees 
Committee assignments for the current session are:
Consumer Affairs, Chair
Regulated Professions

District 4 
Each of the 40 districts in the New Jersey Legislature has one representative in the New Jersey Senate and two members in the New Jersey General Assembly. The representatives from the 4th District for the 2022—2023 Legislative Session are:
Senator Fred H. Madden  (D)
Assemblyman Paul D. Moriarty  (D)
Assemblywoman Gabriela Mosquera  (D)

Personal life
Moriarty was raised in Salem, Massachusetts and received a B.A. from Temple University in Communications. He has been a resident of Washington Township, Gloucester County, New Jersey since 1996. He and his wife Lisa have a daughter, Meghan. Moriarty, who had sponsored a bill for increasing penalties for those making false emergency calls in a process called swatting, was the recipient of a hoax call at his home in April 2015.

On July 31, 2012, Moriarty was pulled over by Washington Township police officer Joseph DiBuonaventura on Route 42 for allegedly driving while intoxicated. Moriarty denied the charges. The police dashcam in DiBuonaventura's car contradicted his police report and charges against Moriarty were dismissed. DiBuonaventura was found not guilty on charges of misconduct and further charges against him were dropped when a judge ruled that the Township's police procedures were unlawful. As a result of the incident, Moriarty has created legislation that would require dashcams in all new police cars.

Electoral history

Assembly

References

External links
Assemblyman Moriarty's legislative web page, New Jersey Legislature
New Jersey Legislature financial disclosure forms
2012 2011 2010 2009 2008 2007 2006 2005
Assembly Member Paul D. Moriarty, Project Vote Smart
Initiatives to Curb Excessive State Employee Compensation
Madden, Moriarty, Mosquera Official Website

1956 births
Living people
American television journalists
Emmy Award winners
Mayors of places in New Jersey
Democratic Party members of the New Jersey General Assembly
People from Washington Township, Gloucester County, New Jersey
Politicians from Gloucester County, New Jersey
Politicians from Salem, Massachusetts
Temple University alumni
American male journalists
21st-century American politicians